Sritam Das is an Odia actor and director.
He made his Ollywood debut with the film Sabitri in 1995.

Filmography

References

External links

Male actors from Odisha
Indian male models
Male actors in Odia cinema
Year of birth missing (living people)
Living people